Terry Turner is a male British former sports shooter.

Sports shooting career
Turner represented England and won a gold medal in the 25 metres rapid fire pistol pairs with Brian Girling, at the 1986 Commonwealth Games in Edinburgh, Scotland.

References

Living people
British male sport shooters
Shooters at the 1986 Commonwealth Games
Commonwealth Games medallists in shooting
Commonwealth Games gold medallists for England
Year of birth missing (living people)
Medallists at the 1986 Commonwealth Games